Darby Transportation Center is an intermodal transit station in Darby, Pennsylvania, run by SEPTA. It serves SEPTA Subway-Surface Trolley Lines 11 and 13 as well as SEPTA Suburban Division buses. Near the terminal, a mural can be found of a wall celebrating the arrival of the first Darby streetcars in 1858.

The 13 line only serves the Darby Loop when cars are leaving service. Trolleys cannot enter heading westbound from Main Street, but can exit eastbound onto 9th Street following the 11 line tracks to the Elmwood Yard.

No direct connection exists between the stations.

Bus connections
SEPTA Suburban Division bus routes 113, 114, and 115

References

External links

SEPTA Route 11 and 13 Maps
 Station from Google Maps Street View

SEPTA Subway–Surface Trolley Line stations
Railway stations in the United States opened in 1858
SEPTA stations and terminals
Railway stations in Delaware County, Pennsylvania
Darby, Pennsylvania
1858 establishments in Pennsylvania